Prachaya Ruangroj (born July 28, 1994), known professionally as Singto, is a Thai actor. He is well known in Thailand for his role as Kongphop in SOTUS: The Series released in 2016.

Early life and education
Singto was born as Prachaya Ruangroj on July 28, 1994 in Bangkok, Thailand. He graduated elementary school at Bharat Vidyalaya School. He graduated with learning science & mathematics from the Suankularb Wittayalai School and enrolled at an undergraduate program in agricultural economics at Faculty of Economics, Kasetsart University. He graduated with Bachelor of Communication Arts in Broadcasting and Streaming Media Production from Bangkok University.

Career 
Singto made his acting debut in 2016 in the Thai BL series called SOTUS: The Series where he played the lead role of Kongphop alongside Perawat Sangpotirat who played the lead role of Arthit.

In 2017, he once again portrayed the lead role of Kongphop in its sequel SOTUS S: The Series, and in 2018, for Our Skyy.

From November 2018 to February 2019, he played the lead role of Earth in Friend Zone.

In 2019, he played the lead role of Med in He's Coming to Me alongside Pawat Chittsawangdee which earned them the "Best Dramatic Scene" award at the 2020 LINE TV Awards.

In 2020, he played the role of Maitee in I'm Tee, Me Too. He also reprises his role as Earth in Friend Zone 2: Dangerous Area.

In April 2021, his contract with GMMTV ended and he has started his own YouTube channel.

Filmography

Television

Short films

Variety shows

Music video appearances

Discography

Events

Live events

Concerts

Awards and nomination

References

External links
Prachaya Ruangroj on YouTube

1994 births
Living people
Prachaya Ruangroj
Prachaya Ruangroj
Prachaya Ruangroj
Prachaya Ruangroj
Prachaya Ruangroj
Prachaya Ruangroj